Simonswood is a civil parish in the West Lancashire district of Lancashire, England. At the 2001 census, the population was 130, increasing to 151 by the 2011 census.

It was originally a township associated with the parish of Walton on the Hill, and became a separate civil parish in 1866. From 1894 to 1974 it formed part of the West Lancashire Rural District. On 1 April 1974, under the Local Government Act 1972, it was transferred to the Metropolitan Borough of Knowsley in the new metropolitan county of Merseyside. The Simonswood parish was transferred back to Lancashire (to the West Lancashire district), on 1 April 1994.

There is one listed building in the parish, Simonswood Hall, which is listed at Grade II*.

See also
Simonswood Supply Depot

References

External links

Villages in Lancashire
Civil parishes in Lancashire
Geography of the Borough of West Lancashire